Türlü is a casserole of Turkish cuisine. It is made of stewed vegetables and may also include stewed meat. Varieties of this dish are also found in Balkan cuisines. In particular, it is known as turli perimesh in Albania, tourlou or tourlou tourlou in Greece, and as turli tava in North Macedonia.

The name derives from Old Turkic word türlüg meaning "variety". Türlü may be cooked in a clay cooking pot called güveç. This type is called türlü güveç in Turkey and in Bulgaria. The Macedonian version, turli tava, is traditionally made in a similar earthenware cooking pot, called tava.

The basic ingredients of türlü vary greatly. The dish usually includes potatoes, eggplants and okra. Green beans, bell peppers, carrots, courgette, tomatoes, onions and garlic can also be added. Meat versions are made with beef or lamb, in the Balkans also with pork. Other usual ingredients are cooking oil, water, salt, black pepper or crushed red pepper, tomato paste or pepper paste. All these ingredients are mixed and baked in an oven. The dish can be served with rice and yogurt on the side.

See also

 Ajapsandali
 Bamia
 Caponata
 Chanakhi
 Ghivetch
 Khoresh
 Pisto
 Ratatouille

References 

Albanian cuisine
Balkan cuisine
Bulgarian cuisine
Greek cuisine
Macedonian cuisine
Mediterranean cuisine
Sephardi Jewish cuisine
Turkish stews
Stews
Casserole dishes